"I'm a Mess" is a song by Canadian singer Avril Lavigne and English singer Yungblud, released on November 3, 2022. The song is the third single and appears on the deluxe edition of Lavigne's seventh studio album Love Sux.

Background
The release of "I'm a Mess" was announced on October 24, 2022, in a livestream featuring Yungblud cutting Lavigne's hair with a snippet of the song playing.

Composition
"I'm a Mess" is a "a slow-burning guitar ballad" which "begins with Lavigne singing about an absent loved one", and "drums kick in later ahead of Yungblud's verse, which hears the Doncaster artist say his life "hasn't been the same since that night". In the chorus, the duo each long for a reunion".

Critical reception
"I'm a Mess" was received positively upon release; with Jack Rogers of Rock Sound describing the song as "really lovely", and an "open, existential and sentimental love song all about feeling lost and alone but knowing that there is someone else at there who can bring it back to the centre", further remarking that "the duo bounce off and complement each other beautifully, making it a track that will stick with you long after it has faded away." Writing for Kerrang!, Emily Carter referred to the song as "a sweet, sentimental ballad".

Consequence named "I'm a Mess" as Song of the Week, with Paolo Ragusa praising both Lavigne's and Yungblud's vocals and their "authentic performances and heartfelt honesty";  further remarking "if 'I'm a Mess' is any indication, Lavigne's next album cycle might double down on this kind of sincerity, and she sounds radiant and truly inspired. And with a pop rock hook that belongs among the best of Lavigne's choruses, 'I'm a Mess' is a memorable step forward for both [Yungblud] and Avril Lavigne."

Commercial performance
In the United States, "I'm A Mes" had commercial success on airplay were it reached at number 12 on the US Adult Top 40 chart. It debuted at number 33 on the US Billboard Hot Rock & Alternative Songs chart. The song reached at number 24 on the US Pop Airplay chart and it spent fourteen weeks on the chart.

Music video
The music video for "I'm a Mess" was released the same day as the single, and features Lavigne "getting reflective in the sunshine while [Yungblud] wanders around a gloomy London, before they meet up at the end for a performance of the song."

Track listing and formats
Digital download
"I'm a Mess" – 3:07

Streaming
"I'm a Mess" – 3:07
"Bois Lie" (Avril Lavigne featuring Machine Gun Kelly) – 2:43
"Love It When You Hate Me" (Avril Lavigne featuring Blackbear) – 2:25
"Bite Me" (Avril Lavigne) – 2:39

Digital download and streaming (Japanese extended play)
"I'm a Mess" – 3:07
"Mercury in Retrograde" (Avril Lavigne) – 2:09
"Pity Party" (Avril Lavigne) – 1:54

Charts

Release history

References

2022 singles
2022 songs
Avril Lavigne songs
DTA Records singles
Elektra Records singles
Pop ballads
Rock ballads
Song recordings produced by John Feldmann
Song recordings produced by Travis Barker
Songs written by Avril Lavigne
Songs written by John Feldmann
Songs written by Travis Barker
Songs written by Yungblud
Yungblud songs